Artem Fedorchenko (born 13 April 1980) is a retired Ukrainian footballer.

Career
Fedorchenko began playing football with FC Stal Alchevsk's youth side, and would eventually play twelve Ukrainian Premier League matches for the club during the 2000–01 season. He played for Russian First Division club FC Neftekhimik Nizhnekamsk during the 2003 and 2004 seasons, and had a brief spell with Belarusian Premier League side MTZ-RIPO Minsk before joining FC Metallurg-Kuzbass Novokuznetsk for the 2005 season.

Fedorchenko spent the following two seasons with MTZ-RIPO Minsk, but left the club after suffering a serious injury in June 2007.

He most recently played for Uzbek League club Qizilqum Zarafshon before joining Naftan Novopolotsk.

References

External links 
 
 
 
 Profile at Sportbox

1980 births
Living people
People from Novocherkassk
Ukrainian footballers
Association football defenders
Ukrainian expatriate footballers
Expatriate footballers in Russia
Expatriate footballers in Belarus
Expatriate footballers in Uzbekistan
FC Stal Alchevsk players
FC Stal-2 Alchevsk players
FC Shakhtar Stakhanov players
FC Partizan Minsk players
FC Komunalnyk Luhansk players
FC Konti Kostiantynivka players
FC Naftan Novopolotsk players
FC Tytan Armyansk players
FC Neftekhimik Nizhnekamsk players
FC Novokuznetsk players